Vasile Tcaciuc (1900 – October 17, 1935) was a Romanian serial killer who lured victims and then murdered them with an axe that he specially constructed. He killed between 21 and 26 people from 1930 to 1935; the primary motive was robbery. 

Originally from Bessarabia, Tcaciuc was known to the Iași police since around 1930, and had been arrested and sent to prison on robbery and burglary charges. On 7 September 1935, a dog found six bodies under his house in Iași. He confessed to having committed at least 21 murders at the behest of a 17-year old girl, who then helped him bury the victims under the floors of several isolated houses and in a forest. He was shot dead by a policeman while trying to escape during a reconstruction of one of his crimes.

See also
List of serial killers by country
List of serial killers by number of victims

References

External links

1935 deaths
1900s births
20th-century criminals
Male serial killers
People from Iași County
People shot dead by law enforcement officers
Prisoners who died in Romanian detention
Romanian people who died in prison custody
Romanian serial killers
Serial killers who died in prison custody
Year of birth missing
Romanian people convicted of murder
People from Bessarabia Governorate
Violence against women in Romania